Arso Airport is an airport in Arso, Indonesia.

References

Airports in Papua (province)